Majority (absolute majority), a mathematic concept, is the greater part, or more than half, of the total.

Majority may also refer to:

Plurality, sometimes referred to as "relative majority"
Majority (sociology), related to the minority group
Age of majority, the threshold of adulthood in law
Majority function in Boolean algebra
The office held by a member of the armed forces in the rank of major
Majority (film), a 2010 Turkish drama film

See also

Major (disambiguation)
Majority opinion, a judicial opinion agreed to by more than half of the members of a court

Social science disambiguation pages